

Clear Vision Limited from Start to Liquidation

Silver Vision was a British video production and distribution label in which the Headquarters was in Enfield, London, England as it Used to be owned by Clear Vision Limited. 

From 7 July 1990 to 31 December 2012, the label was the official licensee for WWF/WWE Home Video in Europe. Clear Vision's headquarters were based in 1 Kings Avenue, Winchmore Hill, London https://find-and-update.company-information.service.gov.uk/company/02822227

Clear Vision Limited Incorporated from 27 May 1993 with 15 officers Over the years from January 22, 2022 and 12 Decided to Resignations in that period, Due to being in Dept and then Bankruptancy.https://find-and-update.company-information.service.gov.uk/company/02822227/filing-history

History
Silver Vision had exclusive distribution rights to the WWE Tagged Classics range, a unique series of DVD's that were exempt from well-documented legal restraints imposed by federal lawsuits initiated by the World Wide Fund for Nature in 2002. The lawsuits prohibited the referencing and use of all versions of the World Wrestling Federation logo and the initials "WWF", with only the DVD cover art and menu screens of the "Tagged Classics" displaying the World Wrestling Entertainment logo and the initials "WWE".

In July 2012, WWE came to a new agreement with the World Wide Fund for Nature which allowed the WWE to no longer censor any of the WWF logos and the spoken initials of "WWF", however, WWE cannot use any WWF logos in the present day, except in archival footage.

End of Silver Vision

Silver Vision parted ways with WWE on 31 December 2012, with nWo: The Revolution being the labels final WWE release. On 19 November 2012, it was announced that FremantleMedia (now Fremantle) would be the new WWE Home Video distributor for the United Kingdom and the rest of Europe.

Clear Vision also distributed Gaiam, Gormiti, Marvel Animation, NBA and UFC DVD's at retail outlets and through its website. Shortly after losing distribution rights for WWE Home Video, Clear Vision took over as distributor for TNA Home Video in the United Kingdom and Europe. In December 2013, Clear Vision was called into the administration.

OnWrestling DVD Network, Silver Vision released a statement informing fans that as of December 31, 2012 they would be parting ways with WWE.

Silver Vision Limited Incorporated Created Silver Vision Limited with 5 officers in 14 Years and 2 resigned from 7 July 2000 to 29 July 2014, when the Company decided to do a Voluntary Strike-Off. https://find-and-update.company-information.service.gov.uk/company/04028997 & https://find-and-update.company-information.service.gov.uk/company/04028997/filing-history

Home Media
Silver Vision released about Roughly 100 to 200 DVDs in 14 years from 7 July 2000 to 29 July 2014, which are: 1. Documentaries About the WWE Wrestlers, 2. ECW DVDs Up to It's Closure, 3. All of the WWE Exclusives DVD's and WWE Tagged Series DVD's.

Region 2 DVDs

Silver Vision Documentaries Exclusive Releases

Silver Vision ECW Exclusive Releases

WWE DVDS & WWE Tagged Classics Main Series

Silver Vision WWE Exclusive Releases

References

External links

Film production companies of the United Kingdom
Mass media companies established in 1988
1988 establishments in the United Kingdom
2012 disestablishments in the United Kingdom
Companies disestablished in 2012
WWE